William or Bill Keating may refer to:

William H. Keating (1799–1840), American geologist
William J. Keating (1927–2020), former U.S. Representative from Ohio
Bill Keating (politician) (born 1952), U.S. Representative from Massachusetts
Bill Keating (American football) (1944–2015), American football player and attorney
Bil Keating (born 1940), Irish television and stage producer